"Seeking the Magic Mushroom" is a 1957 photo essay by amateur mycologist Robert Gordon Wasson describing his experience taking psilocybin mushrooms in 1955 during a Mazatec ritual in Oaxaca, Mexico. Wasson was one of the first Westerners to participate in a Mazatec ceremony and to describe the psychoactive effects of the Psilocybe species. The essay contains photographs by Allan Richardson and illustrations of several mushroom species of Psilocybe collected and identified by French botanist Roger Heim, then director of the French National Museum of Natural History. Wasson's essay, written in a first person narrative, appeared in the May 13 issue of Life magazine as part three of the "Great Adventures" series.

The essay was part of three related works about mushrooms released around the same time period.  It was preceded by the limited release of Mushrooms, Russia and History, a two-volume book by Wasson and his wife, Valentina Pavlovna Wasson.  The Life magazine essay was followed six days later by "I Ate the Sacred Mushroom", an interview with Valentina in This Week magazine.  Against Wasson's wishes, a Life magazine editor added the term "Magic Mushroom" to the title and brought its use into popular culture.  The essay influenced the nascent counterculture in the United States and led many hippies to travel to Mexico in the 1960s in search of the mushroom, including Timothy Leary.  In the 1970s, Wasson expressed misgivings about the wide publicity the essay brought to the Mazatec culture and the defilement of the mushroom ritual.

Background

Wasson first became interested in mycology during his honeymoon in the Catskill Mountains in 1927. His new wife, Valentina Pavlovna Wasson, a native of Moscow, Russia, was identifying and collecting mushrooms in the forest, having been brought up with an appreciation for the species.  Wasson was disgusted. "Like all good Anglo-Saxons, I knew nothing about the fungal world and felt that the less I knew about those putrid, treacherous excrescences the better."  The incident sparked Wasson's interest in mushrooms, leading to subsequent contributions to the field of ethnomycology.

In 1952, English poet Robert Graves sent the Wassons a letter containing a journal article quoting American ethnobotanist Richard Evans Schultes discussing the ritual use of mushrooms by Mesoamericans in the 16th century. The ritual was first observed in modern times in 1938 by American anthropologist Jean Basset Johnson in Huautla de Jiménez, in the Sierra Mazateca region of Oaxaca, Mexico. Beginning in 1953, Wasson repeatedly traveled to Mexico in search of the mushrooms.  On a trip to the town of Huautla de Jiménez in June and July 1955, Wasson and New York society photographer Allan Richardson participated in a mushroom ritual with curandera Maria Sabina, where they became, in Wasson's words, "the first white men in recorded history to eat the divine mushrooms". (When Wasson returned to the U.S., he sent some of the mushrooms to Dr. Andrija Puharich of the Round Table Foundation in Maine; Puharich analyzed them and identified muscarine, atropine, and bufotenin as the chemicals responsible for hallucinogenic effects, and also used them on himself and others. Among these was the sculptor Harry Stump, in the presence of Aldous Huxley, who paid Puharich a three-week visit in August 1955.)

While having  lunch at the Century Club in New York in 1956, a Time magazine editor expressed interest in their trip to Mexico and invited them to pitch a story about their experience.

Notes

References

Allen, John W. 2002. Mushroom Pioneers.  Psilly Publications.  .
Cloud, John. 2007. When the Elite Loved LSD. Time (April 23).
 Feinberg, Ben. 2009. “A Symbol Of Wisdom And Love? Counter-Cultural Tourism And The Multiple Faces Of María Sabina In Huautla, Oaxaca.” The Politics of Space and Imagery (2009): 93–114.           
Harvard University Herbaria. 2002. R. Gordon Wasson (1898-1986) Archives.  Harvard University.
Harvey, Graham. 2003. Shamanism: A Reader. Routledge. .
Bone, Eugenia. 2011. Mycophilia: Revelations from the Weird World of Mushrooms. Rodale. .
Lee, Martin A. Shlain, Bruce. 1992. Acid Dreams: The Complete Social History of LSD: The CIA, the Sixties, and Beyond. Grove Press. .
Karttunen, Frances E. 1994. Between Worlds: Interpreters, Guides, and Survivors. Rutgers University Press. .
Letcher, Andy. 2008. Shroom: A Cultural history of the Magic Mushroom. Harper Collins. .
Reiedlinger, Thomas J. 1990. The Sacred Mushroom Seeker: Essays for R. Gordon Wasson.  Dioscorides Press. .
Reuters. 1970. Hippies Flocking to Mexico for Mushroom 'Trips'. The New York Times (July 22). 
Ruck, Carl. 2010. Wasson and the Psychedelic Revolution. Brainwaving. Beckley Foundation.
Singer, Rolf. 1958. Mycological Investigations on Teonanácatl, the Mexican Hallucinogenic Mushroom. Part I. The History of Teonanácatl, Field Work and Culture Work. Mycologia 50, no. 2 (March–April): 239–261. 
Stafford, Peter. 1993. Psychedelics Encyclopedia. Ronin Publishing. .
Wasson, R. G. 1957. Seeking the magic mushroom. Life 49, no. 19 (May 13): 100–102, 109–120.
Stevens, Jay. 1998. Storming Heaven: LSD and the American Dream. Grove Press. .
Wasson, R. Gordon. 1970. Drugs: The Sacred Mushroom. The New York Times (Sept 26): 21. 
Wasson, Valentina Pavlovna. 1957. I Ate the Sacred Mushroom. This Week. (May 19): 8–10, 36.
Wasson, Valentina Pavlovna and R. Gordon Wasson. 1957. Mushrooms, Russia and History. Vol II. New York: Pantheon Books. 
Weiner, Tim. 2002. Huautla Journal; The Place for Trips of the Mind-Bending Kind. The New York Times (May 8).

Further reading

Wasson, R. Gordon. 1961. The Hallucinogenic Fungi of Mexico: an inquiry into the origins of the religious idea among primitive peoples. Botanical Museum Leaflets, Harvard University 19: 137–162.
Wasson, R. Gordon, Hofmann, Albert, Ruck, Carl A. P. 1978. The Road to Eleusis: Unveiling the Secret of the Mysteries. New York: Harcourt, Brace Jovanovich.

External links
 Full text at  Multidisciplinary Association for Psychedelic Studies (MAPS)

1957 essays
Psychedelic drug research
Works originally published in Life (magazine)
Psychedelic literature